Smith, Kline & French (SKF) was an American pharmaceutical company.

History
In 1830, John K. Smith opened a drugstore in Philadelphia, and his younger brother, George, joined him in 1841 to form John K Smith & Co. In 1865, Mahlon Kline joined Smith and Shoemaker, as John K Smith and Co had become in the meantime, as a bookkeeper. In 1875, he took on additional responsibilities as a salesman and added many new and large accounts, as a reward the company, Mahlon K Smith and Company, was renamed into Smith, Kline and Company.

In 1891, Smith, Kline and Company acquired French, Richards and Company, founded in 1844 by Clayton French and William Richards, which provided the company with a greater portfolio of consumer brands. In 1929 Smith, Kline and French Company was renamed into Smith Kline and French Laboratories and the company put more focus on research in order to sustain its business. 

In 1932, SKF chemist Gordon Alles was awarded a patent for amphetamine.

In 1968, the company acquired Recherche et Industrie Thérapeutiques in Belgium and changed its name in SmithKline-RIT.

SmithKline acquired Allergan in 1982, an eye and skincare business, and merged with Beckman Instruments, Inc., a company specialising in diagnostics and measurement instruments and supplies. After the merger the company was renamed SmithKline Beckman.

SmithKline Beckman and The Beecham Group plc merged in 1989 to form SmithKline Beecham plc. In 2000, SmithKline Beecham  merged with Glaxo Wellcome to form GlaxoSmithKline (GSK).

References

External links
 History of GSK

Pharmaceutical companies disestablished in 2000
Defunct pharmaceutical companies of the United States
GSK plc
1830 establishments in Pennsylvania
2000 mergers and acquisitions